15 kDa selenoprotein is a protein that in humans is encoded by the SEP15 gene. Two alternatively spliced transcript variants encoding distinct isoforms have been found for this gene.

Function 

This gene encodes a selenoprotein, which contains a selenocysteine (Sec) residue at its active site. The selenocysteine is encoded by the UGA codon that normally signals translation termination. The 3' UTR of selenoprotein genes have a common stem-loop structure, the sec insertion sequence (SECIS), that is necessary for the recognition of UGA as a Sec codon rather than as a stop signal. Studies in mouse suggest that this selenoprotein may have redox function and may be involved in the quality control of protein folding.

Clinical significance 

This gene is localized on chromosome 1p31, a genetic locus commonly mutated or deleted in human cancers.

Protein domain

The protein this gene encodes for is often called Sep15 however in the case of mice, it is named SelM. This protein is a selenoprotein only found in eukaryotes. This domain has a  thioredoxin-like domain and a surface accessible active site redox motif. This suggests that they function as thiol-disulfide isomerases involved in disulfide bond formation in the endoplasmic reticulum.

Function 
Recent studies have shown in mice, where the SEP15 gene has been silenced the mice subsequently became deficient in SEP15 and were able to inhibit the development of colorectal cancer.

Structure
The particular structure has an alpha/beta central domain which is actually made up of three alpha helices and a mixed parallel/anti-parallel four-stranded beta-sheet.

References

Further reading 

 
 
 
 
 
 
 
 
 
 
 

Selenoproteins